Kanyā Pūjā or Kumārī Pūjā, is a Hindu holy ritual, carried out especially on the Ashtami (eighth day) and Navami (ninth day) of the Navaratri festival. The ceremony primarily involves the worship of nine girls, representing the nine forms of Goddess Durga (Navadurga). As per Hindu philosophy, these girls are considered as the manifestation of the natural force of creation. Legend says that it was on the ninth day of Navaratri that Shakti had taken the form of Goddess Durga, on the request of the devas to kill the demon Mahisasura.

Customs

It is a custom to wash and clean the feet of these nine young girls as a mark of respect for the Goddess and offer new clothes as gifts by the devotee. Kanya Puja as a part of Devi worship is to recognise the feminine power vested in the girl child. 

Customs suggests that by worshipping girls of different Varna, the worshipper will have their desires fulfilled. For example, if the desire is acquiring knowledge then he should worship a Brahmin child. If he is desirous of acquiring power, then he should worship a Kshatriya-girl child. Similarly, if he is desirous of acquiring wealth and prosperity, then a girl child belonging to a Vaishya family should be worshipped by him. If one needs to wash their past sins, should worship a Shudra-girl child. There is also a ritual purification and chanting of mantras. She is made to sit on a special pedestal. She is worshipped by offering ‘akshat‘ (rice grains) and by burning incense sticks. She is worshipped because, according to the philosophy of ‘Striyah Samastastava Devi Bhedah’, women symbolize Mahamaya (the goddess Durga). Even among these a girl child is considered to be the purest, because of her innocence.

Philosophy
Hinduism believes in the universal creative forces to be feminine gender. The very original force is Mahamaya whose inspiration created the gods and the rest of the cosmos. The inspiration is the life force of the entire creation. All the major and minor energies and forces are represented by various goddesses. Navaratra deity Durga and all her dimensions are believed to be the manifestations of the same basic inspiration Mahamaya.

Religiously speaking, Devi is essentially a worship of the great feminine. In a kanya the great feminine potential is at its peak. having developed into a girl of a certain age and before attaining puberty, a female child is considered the most auspicious, most jagrat, and the most clear minded and clear souled individual. While invoking the parashakti in such a form the purity of mind body and spirits is required and is fulfilled by a girl child of the said age of 8+ before reaching puberty. Such a female child is indeed Devi, who in her later life takes the roles of Parvati as a wife and mother, Lakshmi as a housewife, Saraswati as the first guru of her children, Durga as the destroyer of all obstacles for her family, Annapurna as the food provider through her cooking, Kali as the punisher to bring the members of the family on the right track, etc.

References

External links 
 https://web.archive.org/web/20090321063128/http://www.riiti.com/2008-04-kumari_kanya_pujan_-why_worship_virgin_girl.html
Hindu festivals
Religious festivals in India
September observances
October observances
Hindu festivals in India
Women's festivals
Hindu festivals in Nepal